Made in USA is a compilation album by Japanese pop band Pizzicato Five. The album was released in the United States on October 11, 1994 by Matador Records, serving as the band's first full-length, and second overall, American release on the label. Along with the Five by Five EP released earlier in 1994, it introduced Pizzicato Five to a Western audience.

The compilation is titled after the 1966 film Made in U.S.A, directed by Jean-Luc Godard, one of the band's inspirations.

Critical reception

In 2011, Made in USA was included in LA Weeklys "beginner's guide" to Shibuya-kei music.

Track listing

Notes
 "Magic Carpet Ride" and "Baby Love Child" feature re-recorded English vocals.

References

External links
 

1994 compilation albums
Pizzicato Five albums
Matador Records compilation albums
Japanese-language compilation albums